John Terrell is an American para-cyclist who represents the United States internationally.

Career
Terrell made his international debut for the United States at the 2022 UCI Para-cycling Road World Cup where he won a silver medal in the first world cup time trial and a gold medal in the second event.

He represented the United States at the 2022 UCI Para-cycling Road World Championships, where he competed with a broken sternum and bruised lung and finished in sixth place in the road race.

Terrell represented the United States at the 2022 UCI Para-cycling Track World Championships where he won a bronze medal in the scratch race and omnium events.

Personal life
Terrell was hit by a car as a pedestrian at the age of 19 and experienced a brachial plexus injury as a result of blunt-force trauma. He tried to salvage his limbs for over two years, but the nerve transplant surgeries were unsuccessful, and he had his right arm amputated.

References

21st-century American people
Living people
American amputees
American male cyclists
Cyclists from Texas
Year of birth missing (living people)